The 2008 BCI "Irish" music crisis erupted in Ireland in March 2008 when it emerged that certain bands and musicians who had recorded material in Ireland were classified by the BCI as "Irish" music for radio airplay. Independent radio stations regulated by the BCI have an obligation to play agreed levels – in most cases 30% – of Irish music. Concern mounted that genuine Irish music recorded in Ireland by Irish musicians was being overlooked in favour of mainstream international trends.

Background 
On Thursday March 13, hotpress.com published an article that revealed R.E.M.’s new album Accelerate will be accepted as "Irish music" by the BCI. The album was recorded in Grouse Lodge Studios and it is this factor that qualifies it as "Irish". The position, which alarmed many musicians and independent record companies, emerged during a question and answer session on Airplay For Irish Music, chaired by Hot Press editor Niall Stokes at the IBI conference in Dublin the previous week, which followed a series of presentations made on Airplay for Irish Music by Niall Stokes, BCI chief executive Michael O'Keeffe, Colm O'Sullivan of Red FM, Dave Pennefather of Universal Music Ireland, Dave Kelly of FM104, Feilim Byrne of Music Control and musician and songwriter Steve Wall of The Walls. Asked by Niall Stokes about definitions of Irish music, members of the panel reported that tracks recorded in Dublin by Kylie Minogue were counted as Irish music by certain stations. Pennyfeather had initially revealed, to the surprise of the audience, that Kelly's stations consider a Kylie Minogue song "Irish". "It was recorded in Windmill Lane" was the excuse Kelly offered, finding support in the surprising quarter of O'Keeffe who said Kelly's position was "absolutely" in line with the BCI's policies. Asked if this was acceptable to the BCI, Michael O’Keeffe confirmed that it was. "It’s supporting the Irish music industry," he said. Minogue recorded a number of tracks for her album Fever in Dublin's Windmill Lane, including the title track and the hit single "Love at First Sight".

O'Keeffe told Phantom News that this has been policy for some time and that there is a legal basis for it:

"...one of the reasons that we have a number of definitions that qualify as Irish is because when the European Commission were considering this matter about ten years ago, they were very clear that we couldn't discriminate in favour of Irish music, other than Irish language. I suppose it was a pragmatic solution for us to look at ways that would support the industry in some way...."

He also said some of the suggestions made for change are simply not feasible, blaming the European Commission for rules surrounding anti-competitiveness:

"....we couldn't bring in a smaller radio quota and have it strictly for Irish artists. That's where we would run into trouble. If we were to bring in a definition of that nature that only applied to Irish artists, then we run into trouble with the European Commission because you cannot favour your own country..."

Reaction

Steve Wall 
Steve Wall's reaction at the time was characteristic of the reaction of musicians generally. "I’m speechless", he said. "That’s the first time I heard that."

Gavin Fox 
"It sounds ridiculous. Shame on them", was the view of Concerto For Constantine bassist, Gavin Fox. "It sounds to me like just another excuse for stations not to get behind Irish music. I reckon R.E.M. and Kylie Minogue would agree with me. There's a huge amount of great Irish music out there. They might say there's no demand for it, but if you play it people will come around."

Colm Ó Snodaigh 
Kíla's Colm Ó Snodaigh quoted Bob Dylan, who wrote that radio was "gutless and flabby". "There's a load of great Irish music around right now that radio just doesn't seem to cater for." He went on to exemplify the Choice Music Prize. Ó Snodaigh added: "I wouldn’t like to be the one coming up with the hard and fast rules about what’s Irish and what’s not," he continued. "Sure didn’t we used to have Def Leppard and Lisa Stansfield living here as tax exiles, does that mean they’d count as Irish too? With all due respect to R.E.M., it's great that they’re supporting the Irish music industry and all, but they certainly don't need the extra airplay."

Julie Feeney 
Choice Music Prize winning singer-songwriter Julie Feeney repeated the assertions of the quantity and quality of contemporary Irish music. "They shouldn’t need to rely on a technicality like this – it’s going too far," she said. "All it takes is a bit of imagination and persistence from a DJ who’s willing to take the jump and play Irish artists."

Louis Walsh 
Pop mogul Louis Walsh reacted to the news that Kylie Minogue and R.E.M. records qualify as "Irish" music for radio airplay. "This is crazy," he told Hot Press. "No wonder the music biz in Ireland is the way it is. No wonder Irish record companies are signing nobody. It's because we can't get airplay in our own fucking country for our own home grown talent. It's frustrating and unfair that we are being treated like this. Kylie Minogue is Australian – it's as simple as that. No wonder The Thrills, Ash, Declan O'Rourke, Bell X1 etc. are struggling – because they don't get enough airplay in their own country and their record deals are in the balance because of this. The big Irish radio stations all copy US radio. They're playing Timbaland, Nelly Furtado, Justin Timberlake, Rihanna and similar acts 24/7. Would Snow Patrol have gotten airplay in Ireland for "Chasing Cars"? No, it happened on a US TV show. What would U2 do, if they were starting again in Ireland? They'd struggle because of radio formats copying the US and the UK. And who suffers? The talent – and ultimately the public." The absence of radio play directly affects sales, Walsh argued. "Look at the Irish charts," he said. "They now look like the USA or UK charts. We need to sort this out."

Music directors 
Meanwhile, music directors at two local radio stations have said they would not include international artists who've recorded here as part of their required Irish music output. Colm O’Sullivan of Cork's Red FM said that under no circumstances would his station consider acts who have recorded their album in Ireland, such as R.E.M. and Kylie Minogue, as counting towards the quota of 30% Irish music that all independent stations must adhere to. "We would always aim to promote new, home-grown Irish stuff first and foremost," O'Sullivan told Hotpress.com. "We’re constantly cultivating new bands from the Cork area to get them on our playlist." John Cadell, director of music at Dublin's Phantom 105.2, echoed O’Sullivan's comments. "We would never consider Irish-recorded albums as Irish. We don’t need to," Cadell told Hotpress.com. He confirmed that Phantom plays 20% Irish artists between the hours of 7 am and 7 pm, and 30% Irish over its full 24-hour schedule. The station also commits to playing 6% Irish unsigned bands between 7 am and 7 pm. "If the music is good enough to hold its own, we see no reason why it shouldn’t be played," said Cadell. "We regularly put new Irish bands on our a-list alongside top international acts like the Foo Fighters."

In July, Jon Richards of Galway Bay FM told Hot Press that his station would be giving daytime airplay to emerging Irish music. Richards declared: “I am introducing five dedicated slots, from 3 to 5, for promoting Irish artists and in these five slots, literally any Irish artist whose song or whose track is good enough can get played… This is aimed at promoting new Irish artists.” An important aspect of the initiative is that artists have to play their part, recording a Galway Bay ident to introduce tracks of theirs that are being supported by the station. Richards commented: "A personal touch is needed if you want to communicate. That's what radio is all about." Richards said the Galway Bay FM management team, with MD Keith Finnegan and Music Controller Padraig Flaherty, were fully supportive of the new initiative. Richards said: “We’re taking the plunge. What I’m hoping is that other presenters across the country, especially in big urban areas, will say ‘well, if they’re doing that, why can’t we do it?’ and create an effect that Irish radio gets the kick up the arse that it needs.”

References 

BCI